Hermann Friedhold Plüddemann (17 July 1809, Kolberg - 24 June 1868, Dresden) was a German history painter and illustrator.

Life and work
His father was a prosperous merchant and shipowner. He initially studied with Carl Sieg in Magdeburg then, in 1828, he entered the studios of Carl Joseph Begas in Berlin. Three years later, he enrolled at the Kunstakademie Düsseldorf, where he worked with Friedrich Wilhelm von Schadow.

He moved to Dresden in 1848, to become a professor at the Academy of Fine Arts. He was best known for his series of paintings depicting the lives of Christopher Columbus and Frederick Barbarossa. Much of his work was lost during World War II.

Selected illustrations

  Album deutscher Künstler in Originalradirungen. - Düsseldorf : Buddeus, 1841. (Online) 
 Deutsche Dichtungen mit Randzeichnungen deutscher Künstler. - Düsseldorf : Buddeus, (Vols.1–2) 1843. (Online)
 Reumont, Alfred von. Sagas légendes des bords du Rhin : orné de 8 gravures sur acier. - Aix-la-Chapelle: Kohnen, 1838. (Online) 
 Kugler, Franz. Skizzenbuch. - Berlin : Reimer, 1830. (Online)

Sources
 
 Arthur Schulz: "Hermann Freihold Plüddemann (1809–1868)". In: Martin Wehrmann, Adolf Hofmeister, Wilhelm Braun (Eds.): Pommersche Lebensbilder, Vol.2: Pommern des 19. und 20. Jahrhunderts, Stettin 1936, pp. 85–92
 Ekkehard Mai: Hermann Freihold Plüddemann. Maler und Illustrator zwischen Spätromantik und Historismus (1809–1868). Ein Werkverzeichnis, Böhlau, Köln 2004, 
 "Plüddemann, Hermann" In: Meyers Konversations-Lexikon 1885–1892, Vol.13, pg.138
 Odila Schütz: "Herrmann Freihold Plüddemann 1809–1868", In: Sächsische Heimatblätter, Jahrgang 1999, Vol.1, pp. 34–40

External links

 Biography of Plüddemann @ Kulturstiftung

1809 births
1868 deaths
19th-century German painters
19th-century German male artists
German male painters
People from Kołobrzeg